Hopewell is an unincorporated community in York County, South Carolina, United States. It lies at an elevation of 587 feet (179 m).

References

Unincorporated communities in York County, South Carolina
Unincorporated communities in South Carolina